Charles Simeon Baker (February 18, 1839 – April 21, 1902) was an American politician and a U.S. Representative from New York.

Biography
Born in Churchville, New York, Baker attended the common schools, Cary Collegiate Institute of Oakfield, New York, and the New York Seminary at Lima, New York. He married May L. Baker and Jane E. Baker.

Career
Baker taught school while he studied law. He was admitted to the bar in December 1860 and commenced practice in Rochester, New York.

During the Civil War, Baker served in the Union Army  as first lieutenant, Company E, Twenty-seventh Regiment, New York Volunteer Infantry. Disabled in the first Battle of Bull Run, he was honorably discharged.

Baker was a member of the New York State Assembly (Monroe County, 2nd District) in 1879, 1880 and 1882. He was a member of the New York State Senate (29th District) in 1884 and 1885.

Elected as a Republican to the 49th, 50th, and 51st United States Congresses, Baker was U.S. Representative for the thirtieth district of New York from March 4, 1885, to March 3, 1891. He served as Chairman of the House Committee on Commerce during the 51st Congress. He resumed the practice of law in Rochester, New York.

Death
Baker died from vocal cord paralysis in Washington, D.C., on April 21, 1902 (age 63 years, 62 days). He is interred at Mount Hope Cemetery, Rochester, New York.

References

External links

1839 births
1902 deaths
Burials at Mount Hope Cemetery (Rochester)
Union Army officers
Republican Party members of the New York State Assembly
Republican Party members of the United States House of Representatives from New York (state)
19th-century American politicians